

The de Bruyne DB-2 Snark was a British experimental four-seat cabin monoplane designed by N. A de Bruyne and built by Aero Research Limited (ARL) of Cambridgeshire. It was built to test low weight, bakelite-bonded plywood, stressed skin wing and fuselage structures.

Development
Apart from the structure the Snark was a conventional looking low-wing four-seat cabin monoplane, powered by a nose-mounted 130 hp (97 kW) de Havilland Gipsy Major piston engine. Registered G-ADDL the Snark first flew from Cambridge on 16 December 1934 flown by de Bruyne.

Though stressed plywood skinned aircraft had been built before, it was claimed at the time that the Snark was the first to have been designed with full stress calculations, including loads carried by both wing and fuselage skins. This led to a high loaded/unloaded weight ratio of 1.82; the similarly engined, almost exactly contemporary 3/4 seat Miles Falcon had achieved 1.62.

In May 1936 the Snark was transferred to the Royal Aircraft Establishment at Farnborough for research into the aerodynamics of thick wing monoplanes, with serial number L6103. The aircraft was sold by the RAE on 8 June 1938 but was destroyed by German bombing at Croydon Airport in 1940.

Specifications

References

Notes

Bibliography

1930s British experimental aircraft
Aircraft first flown in 1934
Low-wing aircraft
Single-engined tractor aircraft
Conventional landing gear